Senator Erdman may refer to:

Philip Erdman (born 1977), Nebraska State Senate
Steve Erdman (born 1949), Nebraska State Senate